South Colchester and Maldon was a parliamentary constituency in Essex represented in the House of Commons of the Parliament of the United Kingdom from 1983 to 1997.  It elected one Member of Parliament (MP) by the first past the post system of election.

History 
This seat was created for the 1983 general election from parts of the abolished Colchester constituency and parts of the Maldon constituency. It was abolished at the next redistribution which came into effect for the 1997 general election, when Colchester was re-established as a borough constituency and new county constituencies of Maldon and East Chelmsford and North Essex were created.

It was a safe Conservative seat throughout its existence.

Boundaries
The Borough of Colchester wards of Berechurch, Birch-Messing, East Donyland, Harbour, New Town, Prettygate, Pyefleet, Shrub End, Tiptree, West Mersea, and Winstree, and the District of Maldon.

The constituency was formed from the bulk of the abolished Maldon constituency (the District of Maldon) and southern parts of the Borough of Colchester (including parts of the town of Colchester) which were previously part of the abolished county constituency of Colchester.

The seat was abolished in 1997, with the parts of the town being included in the re-established constituency of Colchester and remaining areas of the Borough of Colchester being included in the new constituency of North Essex, a seat surrounding Colchester. The District of Maldon formed the basis of the new constituency of Maldon and East Chelmsford.

Members of Parliament

Elections

1979 Prediction for Colchester South and Maldon boundaries

Notes and references

Boundary changes

Parliamentary constituencies in Essex (historic)
Constituencies of the Parliament of the United Kingdom established in 1983
Constituencies of the Parliament of the United Kingdom disestablished in 1997
Politics of Maldon District
Politics of Colchester